Gadhi is a village development committee in Rautahat District in the Narayani Zone of south-eastern Nepal. At the time of the 1991 Nepal census, it had a population of 1063.

References 

Rautahat District